Vyskov refers to:

 Vyškov, town in the South Moravian Region of the Czech Republic
 Výškov, village in the Ústí nad Labem Region of the Czech Republic

See also
Vyshkov